23S rRNA (guanine745-N1)-methyltransferase (Rlma(I), Rlma1, 23S rRNA m1G745 methyltransferase, YebH, RlmAI methyltransferase, ribosomal RNA(m1G)-methylase, rRNA(m1G)methylase, RrmA, 23S rRNA:m1G745 methyltransferase) is an enzyme with systematic name S-adenosyl-L-methionine:23S rRNA (guanine745-N1)-methyltransferase. This enzyme catalyses the following chemical reaction

 S-adenosyl-L-methionine + guanine745 in 23S rRNA  S-adenosyl-L-homocysteine + N1-methylguanine745 in 23S rRNA

The enzyme specifically methylates guanine745 at N1 in 23S rRNA.

References

External links 
 

EC 2.1.1